Chalkydri ( khalkýdrai, compound of  khalkós "brass, copper" +  hýdra "hydra", "water-serpent" — lit. "brazen hydras", "copper serpents") are mythical creatures mentioned in the apocryphal Second Book of Enoch from the 1st century CE, often seen as an angelic species.  In the narrative, chalkydri dwell near the Sun and ran its course around the earth with it bringing heat and dew to the earth. The chalkydri and phoenixes are described as creatures with the head of a crocodile and the feet and tail like that of a lion, each having twelve wings, and are the color purple like the rainbow. The phoenixes in Greek myth are not the same 
mentioned here. At sunrise, all the chalkydri break into song with their counterparts, alerting the birds of the world for a new day to rejoice.

The name has been interpreted as a translation of Nehushtan, the bronze serpent constructed by Moses to protect the Israelites from attacks by fiery flying serpents, and destroyed by King Hezekiah as idolatrous, from Hebrew into Greek.

See also
 List of angels in theology

References

Angels
Book of Enoch
Jewish legendary creatures
Legendary creatures
Phoenix birds